The Hardline Quebec Tankard (French: Tankard Hardline), formerly the Quebec Men's Provincial Curling Championship is the Quebec provincial championship for men's curling. The tournament is run by Curling Québec, the provincial curling association. The winner represents Team Quebec at the Tim Hortons Brier. The provincial champion receives the McIntyre Trophy.

A separate team represented Montreal until 1931.

Qualifying
16 teams play in the Quebec provincial. The teams that qualify are the defending champions, the provincial tour champion, the three highest Quebec teams on the Canadian Team Ranking System, the three highest earning teams on the Quebec tour, six regional qualifiers and two last chance qualifiers.

Winners

References

External links
List of champions

The Brier provincial tournaments
Curling competitions in Quebec